Endangered Species is a 1982 science fiction film starring Robert Urich, JoBeth Williams, Peter Coyote and Hoyt Axton, that was directed and co-written by Alan Rudolph.

Plot
Thriller about a burnt out New York ex-cop Reuben Castle (Robert Urich) and a female sheriff (Jo Beth Williams) who begin to fall in love while investigating a string of mysterious cattle mutilations in a small Wyoming town. Castle is a retired alcoholic police lieutenant out visiting the town with his tomboy daughter. At first he tries to stay out of the case but finds himself involved after the mysterious death of his friend Joe Hiatt. Hiatt was the editor of the local paper whose theories about black helicopters have aroused the ire of cattle baron Ben Morgan. Morgan seems to know much more about the cattle killings than he is telling, and may know why the organs of the dead cattle are being harvested.  Castle is trying miserably to stay sober, and he finds himself back in danger and in love, as he and the sheriff work together to get to the bottom of the mystery, encountering incredible danger and resistance from the frightened locals. Morgan, who is turning the locals against Castle, also seems to have links to organizations which are not local, although these are denied.

Cast
 Robert Urich as Ruben Castle
 JoBeth Williams as Harriet Perdue
 Hoyt Axton as Ben Morgan
 Peter Coyote as Steele
 Dan Hedaya as Peck
 Paul Dooley as Joe Hiatt
 Marin Kanter as Mackenzie Castle
 Gailard Sartain as The Mayor
 Harry Carey Jr. as Dr. Emmer
 John Considine as	Burnside

Reception

The New York Times found the idea of the movie ripped from then current headlines of cattle mutilations, and praises the efforts of the cast and editor to make the material of the movie realistic, but that the movie overall was "dumb." TV Guide was kinder to the movie, giving in three out of five stars. They also found the cast to be excellent, and blamed the movie's failure on poor distribution by MGM. The especially recommended the movies for fans of director Alan Rudolph, and praised effect of low-flying helicopters snatching cows from their pastures at night. Creature Feature also liked the movie, giving it 3.5 out of 5 stars. finding the movie thrilling and enthralling.

References

External links
 
 
 

1982 films
1982 independent films
1980s English-language films
1980s science fiction thriller films
American independent films
Films shot in Colorado
Films shot in Wyoming
Films shot in New York (state)
American science fiction thriller films
Metro-Goldwyn-Mayer films
Films directed by Alan Rudolph
1980s American films